Crawfordsburn railway station served Crawfordsburn Hospital (which closed in the early 1990s) and Crawfordsburn Country Park in County Down, Northern Ireland. 
The halt closed in 1997 because of low passenger numbers. The platforms were removed in 2001 during the relaying of the Belfast-Bangor railway line.

References

Disused railway stations in County Down
Railway stations closed in 1997
Railway stations opened in 1965
Railway stations in Northern Ireland opened in the 20th century